The Tecumseh step test is an exercise test that researchers use to determine a subject's cardiovascular fitness level.

The Tecumseh step test is a modified version of the Harvard Step Test developed by Professor Henry J. Montoye. The main differences from the original protocol were the lower step height (8 inches instead of 20), the more moderate stepping rate (24 steps/min instead of 30) and the shorter duration (3 minutes instead of 5 minutes). These alterations made this test easier to perform and suitable for epidemiological studies. 

The Tecumseh step test was employed in the Tecumseh Community Health Study run between the 1950s and 60s. During this epidemiological study, around 5,488 people performed the Tecumseh step test. The number of heart beats from 30 seconds after the end of the 3-minute step test to 1 minute after the step test was used to assess cardiovascular fitness level.

References 

Medical tests